The Tonto Kid is a 1935 American Western film directed by Harry L. Fraser.

Cast 
Rex Bell as "Skeets" Slawson aka The Tonto Kid
Ruth Mix as Nancy Cahill
Buzz Barton as Wesley Fritch
Theodore Lorch as Lawyer Sam Creech
Joseph W. Girard as Rance Cartwright
Barbara Roberts as Edna May Cartwright
Jack Rockwell as Deputy Sheriff Hack Baker
Murdock MacQuarrie as "Pop" Slawson
Bert Lindley as Tom Quillan - Diamond D Foreman
Jane Keckley as Mrs. Fritch, Wesley's Mother
Stella Adams as Edna May's Landlady

External links 

1935 films
1930s English-language films
American black-and-white films
Films based on American novels
Films based on Western (genre) novels
1935 Western (genre) films
American Western (genre) films
Films directed by Harry L. Fraser
Films with screenplays by Harry L. Fraser
1930s American films